Binéfar is a municipality located in the province of Huesca, Aragon, Spain. According to the 2008 census (INE), the municipality has a population of 9,288 inhabitants.

It is the home of the children's theatre group "Los Titiriteros de Binéfar".

Notable people 
 Agustín Abadía (born 15 April 1962) is a Spanish retired footballer who played as a left midfielder, and a current coach.

References

Municipalities in the Province of Huesca